Francis Murphy (6 December 1915 – 12 February 1984) was a Scottish footballer, who played primarily for Celtic at club level.

He represented Scotland once, in a 3–1 victory against Netherlands in May 1938, and also played for the Scottish Football League XI once in 1936, scoring on both occasions.

References

1915 births
1984 deaths
Scottish footballers
Association football wingers
Celtic F.C. players
Limerick F.C. players
Scottish Football League players
Scotland international footballers
Scottish Football League representative players
Maryhill Hibernians F.C. players
St Roch's F.C. players
Albion Rovers F.C. wartime guest players
Tranmere Rovers F.C. wartime guest players
Aldershot F.C. wartime guest players
Royal Air Force personnel of World War II
Scottish Junior Football Association players
Scotland junior international footballers
Footballers from North Lanarkshire